Stadthalle Köln-Mülheim is a conference centre located in Cologne, Germany, which is primarily used for fairs, congresses and concerts. It was built in the 1960s and has a capacity of 1,400 standing or 1,114 seated. Notable past performers include Blue Öyster Cult, Whitesnake, King Crimson, Metallica, The Cure and Judas Priest.

References

External links
Official website

Convention centres in Germany
Buildings and structures in Cologne